The following is a list of ecoregions in Haiti, as identified by the World Wide Fund for Nature (WWF).

Terrestrial ecoregions

Tropical and subtropical moist broadleaf forests
Hispaniolan moist forests

Tropical and subtropical dry broadleaf forests
Hispaniolan dry forests

Tropical and subtropical coniferous forests
Hispaniolan pine forests

Flooded grasslands and savannas
Enriquillo wetlands

Mangrove
Greater Antilles mangroves

Freshwater ecoregions
 Hispaniola

Marine ecoregions
 Greater Antilles

References
 Dinerstein, Eric; David Olson; Douglas J. Graham; et al. (1995). A Conservation Assessment of the Terrestrial Ecoregions of Latin America and the Caribbean. World Bank, Washington DC, .
 Olson, D., Dinerstein, E., Canevari, P., Davidson, I., Castro, G., Morisset, V., Abell, R., and Toledo, E.; eds. (1998). Freshwater Biodiversity of Latin America and the Caribbean: A Conservation Assessment. Biodiversity Support Program, Washington DC, .
 Spalding, Mark D., Helen E. Fox, Gerald R. Allen, Nick Davidson et al. "Marine Ecoregions of the World: A Bioregionalization of Coastal and Shelf Areas". Bioscience Vol. 57 No. 7, July/August 2007, pp. 573-583, .

 
Ecoregions
Haiti